The Belle Glade culture, or Okeechobee culture, is an archaeological culture that existed from as early as 1000 BCE until about 1700 CE in the area surrounding Lake Okeechobee and in the Kissimmee River valley in the Florida Peninsula.

Major archaeological sites of the Belle Glade culture include Belle Glade Mound, Big Mound City, the Boynton Mound complex, Fort Center, Ortona Mound and Tony's Mound. A report and analysis of the two sites was published by Gordon Willey in 1948. The best known site, Fort Center, was the subject of major excavations under the direction of William Sears during the 1970s. Other sites are known from test excavations and/or aerial surveys.

There is little evidence to support the idea that there was a separate and distinct Belle Glade culture. The sites other than Fort Center necessary to support the theory have never been excavated in the almost sixty years after Sears' work and conclusions at Fort Center in the 1960s. The literature does however reveal an attempt by Sears and others to distance the Calusa culture from any and all of the earthwork projects in the Lake Okeechobee Basin area. Based on the archaeology from 1895 to 1945, a view of a single south Florida culture region was established, based on a predominant type of plain ceramics in the region as early as 950 BC in Perico Island and up to 1700 at Marco Island. By 1949 both Gordon Willet and John Goggin authored complete taxonomies and chronologies for the Glades region. Goggin's dates which began earlier, seem to be closer to the actual dates for the various southern sequences.

In 1960, John Goggin and William Sturtevant argued that the Calusa and the lake culture worked together. The same decade, William Sears set out to disprove this commonly held view. In 1980 Sturtevant and Jerald Milanich changed the taxonomy adding two additional culture regions, Okeechobee and Caloosahatchee, making the Glade region smaller and more southern. Vague references to the monumental ceremonial mound complexes were used to support the change. No new archaeology and data resulted in the changed taxonomy. In 2000, state archaeologist Ryan Wheeler authored yet another south Florida taxonomy adding more regions and totally eliminating a Glades Region. Recently, University of Florida graduate student Nathan Lawres 2015, 2017, 2018), has undertaken research and dating of the Okeechobee region. Besides referencing the prehistoric inhabitants by name, the Mayaimi, Lawres sees "alignments" between the Calusa and the Mayaimi, thus bringing the archaeology full circle to the original view. Subsequent research will definitively prove or disprove the existence in fact of a separate Belle Glade culture beginning in 1000 BC and who engineered the monumental mound complexes independently.

Geographic context
The cultural area is defined on the basis of a unique combination of mounds, earthworks and pottery, which have been found around Lake Okeechobee and as far north as Lake Kissimmee. The area has poor, sandy soils, low elevation with low relief (with some higher relief along the western and northern edges of the Kissimmee Valley), and many bodies of water and wetlands. The area consists of pine and palmetto flatwoods, wet prairies, hammocks of live oak and cabbage palm, and cypress swamps. The pine and palmetto flatlands of eastern Martin and Palm Beach counties, sometimes called the East Okeechobee area, and the Kissimmee Valley north of Lake Kissimmee to Lake Tohopekaliga may have also been part of the Belle Glade culture, based on the presence of high numbers of Belle Glade type pottery, and in the northern Kissimmee Valley, similar mounds and earthworks.

Sites

 Belle Glade, Palm Beach County
 Big Mound City, Palm Beach County
 Big Gopher, Palm Beach County
 Maple Mound, Hendry County
 South Lake Mounds, Hendry County
 Tony's Mound, Hendry County
 Clewiston Mounds, Hendry County
 Fort Center, Glades County
 Ortona Mounds, Glades County
 Mulberry Mound, Glades County
 Circle Canal Site, Glades County
 North Fisheating Creek Circle, Glades County
 Lakeport Circle Ditch, Glades County
 Pestle Earthwork, Glades County
 Oxer Borrow, Glades County
 Fort Kissimmee Earthworks, Okeechobee County
 Fulford Earthworks, Okeechobee County
 Clemens Square and Mound, Okeechobee County
 Underhill Sawgrass Pond Site, Okeechobee County
 Barley Barbar, Martin County

Temporal extent
Humans apparently first entered the Lake Okeechobee basin and Kissimmee River valley late in the Archaic period (although there are hints of an earlier, even Paleo-Indian presence). The Belle Glade culture is defined as beginning about 1000 BCE. The older Willey/Bullen chronology divided the Belle Glade culture into three periods; Transitional (1000 – 500 BCE), Belle Glade I (500 BCE – 1000 CE) and Belle Glade II (1000–1700). The more recent Sears chronology divides the Belle Glade culture into four periods; I (1000 BCE – 200 CE), II (200 – c. 700), III (c. 700 – c. 1300) and IV (c. 1300–1700). During the period of European contact, the Mayaimi lived around Lake Okeechobee, and the Jaega lived in the East Okeechobee area. Almost nothing is known of the inhabitants of the Kissimmee Valley during the historic period.

Artifacts and mounds
Most of the pottery found at Belle Glade culture sites is plain, undecorated (Belle Glade Plain and Glades Plain styles). Wood, bone, shell and shark tooth artifacts have been found at a few Belle Glade sites, but are too few to be used in defining the culture.

Earthworks are diagnostic of the Belle Glade culture. Circular ditches appeared early in the Belle Glade culture, by 500 BCE. Habitation mounds and burials in mounds also date to the earliest period. Mounds were also built in Sears' periods II and IV, with mound burials again in period IV. In period IV complexes of mounds and linear embankments were common. Habitation mounds served as dry refuges from flooding during the wet season. Middens are found in oak hammocks near open water.

In 2013, Victor D. Thompson UG, and Thomas J. Pluckhahn SFU researched the site. Besides finding additional mounds and features, their dating showed that Sears' dates were off by 1300 years. The great circle was started around 800 B.C. and soon after the mortuary mound/pond complex was built. These new dates likewise change the chronology. Glade II would have started 800-500 B.C. and would indicate that St. Johns and Weeden Island II culture likewise was earlier.

Subsistence
The people of the Belle Glade culture subsisted on hunting and gathering. Animals in the diet included deer, turtle, snake, fish and fresh water mollusks. While maize may have been cultivated, it was no more than a minor component of the diet.

Footnotes

References

 Reissued 2017 .

Sources

 Reissued 2017 .

Post-Archaic period in North America
Native American history of Florida
South Appalachian Mississippian culture
Archaeological cultures of North America
Mound builders (people)
Indigenous peoples of the Southeastern Woodlands
11th-century BC establishments
17th-century disestablishments in North America